The African red-eyed bulbul or black-fronted bulbul (Pycnonotus nigricans) is a species of songbird in the family Pycnonotidae.
It is found in south-western Africa.
Its natural habitats are dry savanna, subtropical or tropical dry shrubland, and riverine scrub. It feeds on fruit (including Ficus), flowers, nectar, and insects.

Description 
The African red-eyed bulbul ranges from 19 to 21 centimeters (7-8 inches) in length and weighs 30-48 grams (1-1.7 ounces). Its call is a series of loud fluty notes, usually given only by the male.

Taxonomy and systematics
The African red-eyed bulbul was originally described in the genus Turdus. The African red-eyed bulbul is considered to belong to a superspecies along with the Himalayan bulbul, white-eared bulbul, white-spectacled bulbul, Cape bulbul, and the common bulbul. The alternate name of 'red-eyed bulbul' is also used by the Asian red-eyed bulbul.

Subspecies
Two subspecies are recognized:
 P. n. nigricans - (Vieillot, 1818): Found in south-western Angola, Namibia and Botswana and western South Africa
 P. n. superior - Clancey, 1959: Found in central South Africa

Gallery

References

External links

 African red-eyed bulbul - Species text in The Atlas of Southern African Birds.

African red-eyed bulbul
African red-eyed bulbul
Birds of Southern Africa
Fauna of South Africa
Endemic fauna of South Africa
African red-eyed bulbul
African red-eyed bulbul
Taxonomy articles created by Polbot